Ochre River is a local urban district in the Rural Municipality of Lakeshore, Manitoba, Canada, approximately halfway between the City of Dauphin and Ste. Rose du Lac.

It was founded by Sir Douglas Thompson (May 12, 1854 – March 23, 1938) in 1893 as a farming community; many of the buildings have survived since.

Located within the community is Ochre River railway station, which is served by Via Rail. The community also has a post office, hotel, school, community centre, and a municipality office.

The community holds a yearly festival called "Country Daze".

References

Local urban districts in Manitoba

Unincorporated communities in Parkland Region, Manitoba